"You" is the fourth single by German DJ Special D., which was released in 2004. The song peaked at number 18 on the Dutch singles chart.

Track listing

Charts

Release history

References 

2004 singles
2004 songs